Events from the year 1931 in art.

Events
 February 15 – Abstraction-Création group formed in Paris by Theo van Doesburg to promote non-figurative, non-surrealist art. Other founder members include Auguste Herbin, Jean Hélion and Georges Vantongerloo.
 October 4 – Debut appearance of the Dick Tracy comic strip, created by cartoonist Chester Gould.
 The Whitney Museum of American Art is founded by Gertrude Vanderbilt Whitney in its original building in Greenwich Village, New York City.
 The Pierre Matisse Gallery opens in New York City.
 Collector Kay Kimbell of Fort Worth, Texas, purchases his first painting, origin of the Kimbell Art Museum.
 Henry Moore holds his first solo exhibition of sculptures, at The Leicester Galleries in London.

Works

 Max Beckmann – Paris Society
 Thomas Hart Benton – America Today
 Heitor da Silva Costa and Paul Landowski – Christ the Redeemer (statue, Rio de Janeiro)
 Salvador Dalí – The Persistence of Memory
 Robert William Davidson – Eve (sculpture)
 Charles Demuth – Chimney and Watertower
 Antonio Donghi – Woman at the Café
 Frida Kahlo – Frida and Diego Rivera
 Helmut Kolle – Self-Portrait in White Tie
 Tamara de Lempicka – Adam and Eve
 René Magritte – The Voice of Space
 Carl Milles – Flygarmonumentet (Stockholm)
 Anne Marie Carl-Nielsen – The Herd Boy playing a Wooden Flute (monument to the sculptor's husband, the composer Carl Nielsen (d. 1931), at his birthplace, Nørre Lyndelse)
 Georgia O'Keeffe – Cow's Skull: Red, White, and Blue (Metropolitan Museum of Art, New York)
 Pablo Picasso – Figures by the Sea
 Diego Rivera - The Rivals
 Lorado Taft – The Crusader (sculpture)
 Carel Willink – Late Visitors to Pompeii
 Grant Wood
 The Birthplace of Herbert Hoover
 The Midnight Ride of Paul Revere

Awards
 Archibald Prize: John Longstaff – Sir John Sulman

Births
 January 1 – Stephanie Scuris, artist and sculptor
 January 10 – Massimo Vignelli, Italian designer (d. 2014)
 January 18 – Jay Maisel, photographer
 January 21 – Paul Deliège, Belgian comic strip artist and writer (d. 2005)
 January 30 – Linda Nochlin, née Weinberg, American feminist art historian (d. 2017)
 February 7 – Serge Danot, French animator (d. 1990)
 February 9 – Robert Morris, American sculptor (d. 2018)
 February 16 – Irina Dobrekova, Russian painter
 February 17 – Fay Godwin, German-born English landscape photographer (d. 2005)
 February 18 – Johnny Hart, American cartoonist (d. 2007)
 February 21 – Derek Hyatt, English abstract landscape painter (d. 2015)
 February 23 – Tom Wesselmann, American pop artist (d. 2004)
 February 26
 Radomir Stević Ras, Serbian painter and designer (d. 1982).
 Jacques Rouxel, French animator (d. 2004)
 March 4 – Gwilym Prichard, Welsh landscape painter (d. 2015)
 March 13 – Michael Podro, English art historian (d. 2008)
 March 25 – Jack Chambers, Canadian artist and filmmaker (d. 1978)
 April 24 – Bridget Riley, English op art painter
 April 25 – David Shepherd, English wildlife, railway and military painter and conservationist (d. 2017)
 April 26 – Vera Nazina, Russian painter
 April 29 – Frank Auerbach, German-born painter
 May 10 – Olja Ivanjicki, Serbian painter (d. 2009)
 June 7 – Malcolm Morley, English-American photographer and painter
 July 8 – Leo Dee, American silverpoint artist (d. 2004)
 July 15 – Brian Sewell, English art critic (d. 2015)
 July 20 – Sheila Fell, English painter (d. 1979)
 July 25 – Carlo Maria Mariani, Italian painter
 July 28 – Hans Schröder, German sculptor and painter (d. 2010)
 August 15 – Rose Hilton, English painter (d. 2019)
 August 20 – Bernd Becher, German photographer (d. 2007)
 August 24 – Bartolomeu Cid dos Santos, Portuguese artist and professor (d. 2008)
 September 24 – Elizabeth Blackadder, Scottish painter (d. 2021)
 date unknown
 Barrie Cooke, British-born abstract expressionist painter (d. 2014)
 Enno Hallek, Estonian-born Swedish artist

Deaths
 January 7 – Giuseppe Barison, Italian painter (b. 1853) 
 February 3 – Jefferson David Chalfant, American painter  (b. 1856)
 February 11 – Bela Čikoš Sesija, Croatian Symbolist painter (b. 1864)
 March 7
 Theo van Doesburg, Dutch painter and architect, leader of De Stijl (b. 1883)
 Akseli Gallen-Kallela, Finnish painter (b. 1865)
 March 12 – Frida Hansen, Norwegian textile artist (b. 1855)
 March 14 – Alfred Grenander, Swedish-born architect (b. 1863)
 March 24 – Derwent Lees, Australian landscape painter (b. 1885)
 May 1 – Thomas Cooper Gotch, English painter (b. 1854)
 May 31 – Willy Stöwer, German marine painter and illustrator (b. 1864)
 July 11
Giovanni Boldini, Italian painter (b. 1842)
 Jean-Louis Forain, French Impressionist painter (b. 1852)
 September 14 – Tom Roberts, Australian painter (b. 1856)
 September 20 – Max Littmann, German architect (b. 1862)
 September 29 – Sir William Orpen, Irish portrait painter (b. 1878)
 October 7
 Charles Ricketts, English designer (b. 1866)
 Daniel Chester French, American sculptor (b. 1850)
 October 10 – Sir Bertram Mackennal, Australian-born sculptor (b. 1863)
 November 17
 Helmut Kolle, exiled German painter, endocarditis (b. 1899)
 Edward Simmons, American Impressionist painter (b. 1852)
 December 7 – Leslie Hunter, Scottish painter (b. 1877)
 December 31 – Lancelot Speed, British illustrator (b. 1860)
 date unknown
 Todor Švrakić, Serbian painter (b. 1882)
 William John Wainwright, English painter (b. 1855)

See also
 1931 in fine arts of the Soviet Union

References

 
Years of the 20th century in art
1930s in art